Patricia Nead Elrod (b. 1954) is an American novelist specializing in urban fantasy. She has written in the mystery, romance, paranormal, and historical genres with at least one foray into comedic fantasy. Elrod is also an editor, having worked on several collections for Ace Science Fiction, DAW, Benbella Books, and St. Martin's Griffin. She self-published a signed, limited edition novel under her own imprint, Vampwriter Books.

In 2010, she was nominated for the RT Book Reviews Career Achievement Award in Urban Fantasy.

In 2011, she was presented with the RT Book Reviews Pioneer Achievement Award in Vampire Fiction.

Her suspense short story, Beach Girl, won the 2011 Ellery Queen's Mystery Magazine Readers Choice Award.

Overview
P. N. Elrod's start in professional publishing began at TSR writing gaming modules. She has published more than twenty-five novels, beginning in 1990 with her Vampire Files urban fantasy series, featuring hard-boiled private investigator Jack Fleming and his partner, Charles Escott, girlfriend, Bobbi Smythe, and other recurring characters.  The 12 books and counting are set in 1930s Chicago.  Jack's first case was solving his own murder.

Next came the Jonathan Barrett, Gentleman Vampire series, set during the American Revolution.   The twist on these historicals is that Barrett and his family are on the side of the British throughout the revolution, offering a unique point of view of the times.

Another series co-authored with actor Nigel Bennett, who played the evil yet seductive LaCroix on the television show Forever Knight, is of a very different character, but still features a good guy vampire.  The three book Lord Richard, Vampire series from Baen Books are set in a different universe than the Files & Barrett books, but this "James Bond with fangs" maintains Elrod's premise that there are different breeds of vampires co-existing out there.

Using this premise, she has linked her universe to that of Bram Stoker with her sequel to  Dracula, Quincey Morris, Vampire.  Quincey was killed at the end of Dracula, but is resurrected as a vampire himself, albeit a different breed than the infamous count.  Lord Richard makes a brief cameo appearance in the story, and Morris' vampiric state is attributed to a previous blood-sharing with Nora Jones from Elrod's Jonathan Barrett series.

Also quite different, and qualifying as horror, are the Dungeons & Dragons-related books in the Ravenloft world featuring the dark and sinister vampire Count Strahd von Zarovich. These books, I, Strahd: Memoirs of a Vampire, and its sequel, I, Strahd: The War With Azalin, have garnered her critical acclaim from mainstream reviewers.

With The Adventures of Myhr she broke into the humorous fantasy genre.  Myhr is half-man, half-cat and all adventure, magically jumping from world to world spreading the good news about pizza and Beatles karaoke.  His partner is a cranky wizard fond of techno raves and obscene T-shirt art.

Elrod has authored around two dozen short stories in the fantasy, romance, science fiction, mystery, and horror genres, and edited several collections including Time of the Vampires, Dracula in London, and with Roxanne Conrad (aka Rachel Caine) Stepping Through the Stargate: The Science, Archaeology, and Military of Stargate SG-1  The latter is non-fiction and has contributions from world-famous scientists, doctors, the USAF military, FX wizards, and actors from the TV series.

In 2006, she edited an anthology of supernatural romance stories, My Big Fat Supernatural Wedding, which made the USA Today Bestseller list, and won the 2006 P.E.A.R.L. Awards for best anthology.

She followed it with My Big Fat Supernatural Honeymoon, released in January 2008 from St. Martin's Griffin.  It made the New York Times Bestseller extended list and won an honorable mention in the 2007 Pearl Awards for best anthology.

The anthology, Strange Brew, from St. Martin's, also reached the New York Times extended bestseller list in July 2009.

Her collection Dark and Stormy Knights, also with St. Martin's Griffin, was released in July 2010.

Also sold, a new steampunk series, On Her Majesty's Psychic Service, to Tor Books in 2010.

In April 2011, Elrod was presented with the RT Book Review's Pioneers of Genre Fiction Award for "Forging the Way in Vampire Fiction Since 1990."

Her short story, "Beach Girl", published in the November 2011 edition of Ellery Queen's Mystery Magazine, was presented with first place for their annual Readers' Choice Award.

Her collection, Hex Symbols, was released by St. Martin's in June 2012.

Bibliography

Jonathan Barrett, Gentleman Vampire

Red Death (1993, 2004 re-release)
Death and the Maiden (1994, 2004 re-release)
Death Masque (1995, 2004 re-release)
Dance of Death (1996, 2004 re-release)

Ravenloft
I, Strahd: The Memoirs of a Vampire (1993)
Abridged, three-hour audiobook from Random House, performed by Roddy McDowell
I, Strahd: The War Against Azalin (1998)
Both available as audiobooks, unabridged.

Vampire Files

Her Majesty's Psychic Service series 

 The Hanged Man

Other novels
Quincey Morris, Vampire (Baen Books 2001); an expansion of the short story "The Wind Breathes Cold"
The Adventures of Myhr (Baen Books 2003)
On Her Majesty's Psychic Service: The Hanged Man (Tor Books May, 2015 )
On Her Majesty's Psychic Service: The Chariot (Tor Books TBD)
On Her Majesty's Psychic Service: The Empress (Tor Books TBD)

Co-writing with Nigel Bennett
Keeper of the King (with Nigel Bennett) (Baen Books 1997)
His Father's Son   (with Nigel Bennett) (Baen Books 2001)
Siege Perilous     (with Nigel Bennett) (Baen Books 2004)

Anthologies and collections

References

External links
Official Website

RT Book Reviews Pioneers of the Genre Awards

20th-century American novelists
20th-century American women writers
21st-century American novelists
21st-century American women writers
American fantasy writers
American horror novelists
American mystery novelists
American romantic fiction novelists
American women novelists
Living people
Novelists from Texas
Place of birth missing (living people)
Women horror writers
Women mystery writers
Women romantic fiction writers
Women science fiction and fantasy writers
1954 births